Necrovation is a Swedish death metal band from Everöd. The band was formed in 2002 originally with the name Das Über Evils. When the band changed its name to Necrovation, they adopted a more serious sound and got into pure old school death metal (OSDM). Necrovation is considered as "one of the major bands of the Swedish OSDM revival".

Discography 
Das Über Evils
Bratwurst Terror (demo, 2002)
Necrovation
Ovations to Putrefaction (demo, 2004)
Chants of Grim Death (EP, 2004)
Necrovation / Corrupt: Curse of the Subconscious (split, 2005)
Breed Deadness Blood (2008)
Gloria mortus (EP, 2010)
Necrovation (2012)
Storm the void (2023)

See also 
Kaamos
Repugnant
Tribulation

References 

Musical groups established in 2002
Swedish death metal musical groups
2002 establishments in Sweden